3 Arts Entertainment is an American production company and talent management founded by Erwin Stoff, Michael Rotenberg and Howard Klein in 1991.

The company has gone on to produce TV shows such as King of the Hill, The Office, Everybody Hates Chris, Parks and Recreation, The Mindy Project, Brooklyn Nine-Nine, It's Always Sunny in Philadelphia, Unbreakable Kimmy Schmidt, American Vandal as well as produce films Edge of Tomorrow, Unbroken and 13 Hours: The Secret Soldiers of Benghazi. The first movie the company produced was the National Lampoon movie Loaded Weapon 1, which was released on February 5, 1993. The company subsequently set up a deal with 20th Century Fox in 1993. In 1996, 3 Arts made an alliance with CBS and Sony Pictures to launch 3 Arts Television which was dissolved by the end of the following year when it failed to produce any primetime TV projects for the network.

Erwin Stoff founded the company with Michael Rotenberg and Howard Klein, who are all producers and talent managers. Managers Dave Becky, David Miner, Molly Madden and Nick Frenkel work at 3 Arts. In 2003, 3 Arts received a television deal at 20th Century Fox Television. In May 2018, Lionsgate acquired a majority stake in the company.

Films produced

 Loaded Weapon 1 (1993)
 Excessive Force (1993)
 Son in Law  (1993)
 In the Army Now (1994)
 Bio-Dome (1996)
 Chain Reaction (1996)
 Feeling Minnesota (1996)
 Picture Perfect (1997)
 The Devil's Advocate (1997)
 Beverly Hills Ninja (1997)
 Judas Kiss (1998)
 Girl, Interrupted (1999)
 The Matrix (1999)
 Austin Powers: The Spy Who Shagged Me (1999)
 Office Space (1999)
 The Replacements (2000)
 Sweet November (2001)
 Down to Earth (2001)
 Pootie Tang (2001)
 Double Take (2001)
 Hardball (2001)
 Biker Boyz (2003)
 Sol Goode (2003)
 Head of State (2003)
 Constantine (2005)
 Guess Who (2005)
 Stay (2005)
 A Scanner Darkly (2006)
 Man About Town (2006)
 Totally Awesome (2006)
 First Snow (2006)
 The Lake House (2006)
 I Want Someone to Eat Cheese With (2006)
 I Am Legend (2007)
 Reign Over Me (2007)
 Purgatory (2008)
 Henry Poole Is Here (2008)
 The Onion Movie (2008)
 Street Kings (2008)
 The Day the Earth Stood Still (2008)
 The Blind Side (2009)
 Blood Creek (2009)
 Awaydays (2009)
 Boldly Going Nowhere (2009)
 Extract (2009)
 The Extra Man (2010)
 Water for Elephants (2011)
 The Resident (2011)
 The To Do List (2013)
 Beautiful Creatures (2013)
 47 Ronin (2013)
 Kevin Hart: Let Me Explain (2013)
 Edge of Tomorrow (2014)
 All the Wilderness (2014)
 Unbroken (2014)
 Perfect Sisters (2014)
 Burnt (2015)
 13 Hours: The Secret Soldiers of Benghazi (2016)
 Manhattan Night (2016)
 What Now? (2016)
 I Love You, Daddy (2017)
 Rough Night (2017)
 Blue Iguana (2018)
 An Actor Prepares (2018)
 Late Night (2019)
 The Call of the Wild (2020)
 The Lovebirds (2020)
 Chaos Walking (2021)
 Crush (2022)
 The Contractor (2022)
 Beavis and Butt-Head Do the Universe (2022)

TV shows produced

1990s

2000s

2010s

2020s

References

External links

 

1991 establishments in California
American companies established in 1991
Companies based in Beverly Hills, California
Entertainment companies based in California
Film production companies of the United States
Lionsgate
Mass media companies established in 1991
Television production companies of the United States